Canteen is an Australian national support organisation for young people (aged 12–25) living with cancer; including cancer patients, their brothers and sisters, and young people with parents or primary carers with cancer.

Canteen was created by young cancer patients in 1985 and its policies are guided by young people living with cancer. The organisation is also present in New Zealand.

On the last Friday of October, Canteen holds National Bandanna Day. Bandannas are sold to fundraise.

Canteen's celebrity ambassadors include Shannan Ponton, Kate Peck, Chris Bond, Terry Campes, MC Optamus, Kathryn Robinson, Jessica Adamso, David Mackay, Duncan Smith and Joey Toutounji.

References

External links 
Canteen website
Canteen NZ website

Medical and health organisations based in New South Wales
Trans-Tasman organisations
Health charities in Australia